Brucia (minor planet designation: 323 Brucia) is a stony Phocaea asteroid and former Mars-crosser from the inner regions of the asteroid belt, approximately  in diameter. It was the first asteroid to be discovered by the use of astrophotography.

Description 

Brucia was also the first of over 200 asteroids discovered by Max Wolf, a pioneer in that method of finding astronomical objects.  Discovered on December 22, 1891, it was named in honour of Catherine Wolfe Bruce, a noted patroness of the science of astronomy, who had donated $10,000 for the construction of the telescope used by Wolf.

The asteroid is a member of the Phocaea family, a large family of stony S-type asteroids with nearly two thousand known members. It was an outer Mars-crossing asteroid with perihelion less than 1.666 AU until July 2017. For comparison, asteroid 4222 Nancita will become a Mars-crosser in June 2019.  was a Mars-crossing asteroid until January 2016.

Brucia has a synodic rotation period of 9.463 hours (as of 1998). According to the survey carried out by the Infrared Astronomical Satellite, Brucia measures 35.82 kilometers in diameter and its surface has an albedo of 0.1765.

References

External links 
 Asteroid Lightcurve Database (LCDB), query form (info )
 Dictionary of Minor Planet Names, Google books
 Asteroids and comets rotation curves, CdR – Observatoire de Genève, Raoul Behrend
 Discovery Circumstances: Numbered Minor Planets (1)-(5000) – Minor Planet Center
 
 

000323
000323
Discoveries by Max Wolf
Named minor planets
000323
18911222
18911222